Vladimir Tkachenko (born 28 June 1965) is a Ukrainian former swimmer who competed in the 1988 Summer Olympics.

References

1965 births
Living people
Ukrainian male swimmers
Ukrainian male freestyle swimmers
Olympic swimmers of the Soviet Union
Swimmers at the 1988 Summer Olympics
Olympic silver medalists for the Soviet Union
European Aquatics Championships medalists in swimming
Medalists at the 1988 Summer Olympics
Olympic silver medalists in swimming
Soviet male swimmers